The name Kayqubad may refer to the following monarchs of the Seljuk Sultanate of Rûm:

 Kayqubad I (died 1237) 
 Kayqubad II (died 1256) 
 Kayqubad III (died 1302)

See also
 Kai Kobad